The  is an electric multiple unit (EMU) train type operated by Kintetsu Railway in Japan.

History
A total of 168 cars were built between 1969 and 1976. As of January 2021, 24 cars were still in service. Regular limited-express operation ended in February 2021. A farewell run scheduled for 7 August 2021 had to be postponed due to COVID-19.

Rebuilds
Some 12200 series trains were rebuilt into 15200 series and 15400 series trains.

Refurbishment for this tourist-aimed service will include a new interior and seating layout.

References

External links

 Kintetsu official website 

Electric multiple units of Japan
12200 series
ja:近鉄12000系電車#12200系

1500 V DC multiple units of Japan
Kinki Sharyo multiple units